Chaudhry Tariq Subhani is a Pakistani politician from Sialkot who was a Member of the Provincial Assembly of the Punjab, from May 2013 to May 2018. Subhani was born in a prominent Vario family of Gujjars. He is the son of Akhtar Ali Vario a prominent politician and landlord of Sialkot who was elected as Member National Assembly & Member Provincial Assembly of Punjab several times.

Early life and education
He was born on 1 December 1971 in Sialkot.

He has a degree of the Bachelor of Business Administration which he obtained from William Paterson University in 1997. He has a Diploma from Nutley High School.

He holds American citizenship.

Political career

He was elected to the Provincial Assembly of the Punjab as a candidate of Pakistan Muslim League (Nawaz) from Constituency PP-125 (Sialkot-V) in 2013 Pakistani general election. In 2019,he was made the President of PMLN Sialkot chapter and continues to serve in this office.

By-elections 2021
He was given ticket for the Provincial Assembly of the Punjab seat of PP-38  as the candidate of Pakistan Muslim League (N).He was defeated by Pakistan Tehreek-e-Insaf candidate Ahsan Saleem Baryar.

References

Living people
Punjab MPAs 2013–2018
1971 births
Pakistan Muslim League (N) MPAs (Punjab)
Pakistani emigrants to the United States
People with acquired American citizenship
Nutley High School alumni
People from Nutley, New Jersey
William Paterson University alumni